In Greek mythology, the name Emathion (Ancient Greek: Ἠμαθίων) refers to four individuals.
 Emathion, king of Aethiopia or Arabia, the son of Tithonus and Eos, and brother of Memnon. Heracles killed him. Herakles had to fight Emathion, who came across the valley of the Nile on his way to steal the golden apples of the Hesperis, and killed him and gave his kingdom to Memnon. According to a rumor, Emathion wanted to prevent Herakles from stealing the golden apples. a different legend tells that the father of Romus, who founded Rome, was Emathion.

 Emathion, king of Samothrace, was the son of Zeus and Electra (one of the Pleiades), brother to Dardanus, Iasion (Eetion), and (rarely) Harmonia. He sent soldiers to join Dionysus in his Indian campaigns.
Emathion, was aged Aethiopian courtier of Cepheus in Ethiopia. He "feared the gods and stood for upright deeds". Emathion was killed by Chromis during the fight between Phineus and Perseus.
 Emathion, a Trojan prince, and the father of Atymnius by the naiad Pegasis

 In the Aeneid, Emathion is one of the companions of Aeneas in Italy. He was slain by Liger, an ally of Turnus, the opponent of Aeneas.

Notes

References 

 Grimal, Pierre, The Dictionary of Classical Mythology, Wiley-Blackwell, 1996. 
 Nonnus of Panopolis, Dionysiaca translated by William Henry Denham Rouse (1863-1950), from the Loeb Classical Library, Cambridge, MA, Harvard University Press, 1940.  Online version at the Topos Text Project.
 Nonnus of Panopolis, Dionysiaca. 3 Vols. W.H.D. Rouse. Cambridge, MA., Harvard University Press; London, William Heinemann, Ltd. 1940-1942. Greek text available at the Perseus Digital Library.
 Publius Ovidius Naso, Metamorphoses translated by Brookes More (1859-1942). Boston, Cornhill Publishing Co. 1922. Online version at the Perseus Digital Library.
 Publius Ovidius Naso, Metamorphoses. Hugo Magnus. Gotha (Germany). Friedr. Andr. Perthes. 1892. Latin text available at the Perseus Digital Library.
 Publius Vergilius Maro, Aeneid. Theodore C. Williams. trans. Boston. Houghton Mifflin Co. 1910. Online version at the Perseus Digital Library.
 Publius Vergilius Maro, Bucolics, Aeneid, and Georgics. J. B. Greenough. Boston. Ginn & Co. 1900. Latin text available at the Perseus Digital Library.
 Quintus Smyrnaeus, The Fall of Troy translated by Way. A. S. Loeb Classical Library Volume 19. London: William Heinemann, 1913. Online version at theoi.com
 Quintus Smyrnaeus, The Fall of Troy. Arthur S. Way. London: William Heinemann; New York: G.P. Putnam's Sons. 1913. Greek text available at the Perseus Digital Library.

Children of Eos
Demigods in classical mythology
Children of Zeus
Ethiopian characters in Greek mythology
Trojans
Mythology of Heracles
Kings in Greek mythology